Narayana (Also rendered Narayane, Narayanan, Narain, Narayankar or Narine) (from Sanskrit नारायण, nārāyaṇá, literally "eternal man") is an Indian name. It is identical in form to the name of the deity Narayana, another name for Vishnu. The name Narayana is predominantly used in South India especially among Kannada, Tamil, Malayalam and Telugu speakers.

Notable persons

Narayana (Name)
 Suryanarayana (disambiguation)
 Narayana Rao (disambiguation)
 Narayana Murthy (disambiguation)
 Narayana Reddy (disambiguation)
 Narayana Pandit, mathematician
 Narayana Pillai (disambiguation)

Narayan
Narayan (actor), Indian film actor
Narayan (writer), Indian writer
Aditya Narayan, Indian television show host
Alison R.H. Narayan, American chemistry professor
Anand Narayan, Indian television personality
Badri Narayan, Indian artist
Brij Narayan, Indian sarod player
Irene Jai Narayan, Fiji Indian politician
Jagaddipendra Narayan, Maharaja of Cooch Behar
Jayaprakash Narayan, Indian independence activist and politician
Jayaprakash Narayan (Lok Satta), Indian politician
Justin Narayan, Australian youth pastor and chef
Kalanidhi Narayanan (1928 –  2016), Indian dancer and dance teacher
Kirin Narayan, Indian-born American author and folklorist
Kunwar Narayan, Indian poet
Manu Narayan, American actor
Nara Narayan, ruler of Koch kingdom
Opendra Narayan, Indian-American AIDS researcher
Paresh Narayan, Fiji Indian academic
Prema Narayan, Indian actress and dancer
R. K. Narayan, Indian novelist.
Rajee Narayan, Indian dancer and musician
Ram Narayan, Indian sarangi player
Ramesh Narayan, Indian classical singer
Rudy Narayan, British barrister
Shoba Narayan, Indian journalist
Shovana Narayan, Indian Kathak dancer
Siddharth Narayan, Indian actor and singer
Udit Narayan, Indian Playback singer 
Uma Narayan, Indian feminist scholar

Narain
 Narain (actor), Indian actor
 A.K. Narain, Indian historian
 Arunesh Narain Sharma, Civil servant officer
 Govind Narain (1916-2012), a leading civil servant
 Narain Karthikeyan, Indian former Formula One and A1GP driver
 Nicole Narain, American model and actress
 Raj Narain (1917-1986), Indian politician
 Anish Narain, Nicki Minaj enthusiast
 Ruchi Narain, Indian film director and screenwriter
 Sase Narain (1925–2020), Guyanese politician and lawyer
 Sathi Narain (1919-1989), Fiji Indian businessman
 Sunita Narain, Indian environmentalist and political activist
 Vineet Narain, Indian journalist and activist
 Late Maharaj Kumar Basant Narain Singh, Member of the 7th loksabha of India and of the ruling family of Ramgarh Raj
Yogendra Narain, IAS officer

Narayanan
K. R. Narayanan, the tenth President of the Republic of India
Lata Narayanan (born 1966), Indian-Canadian computer scientist
Narayanankutty, Indian film actor in Malayalam movies
Mayankote Kelath Narayanan, National Security Advisor (NSA) to the Prime Minister of India

See also 
 Narayana

Indian surnames
Indian masculine given names